Elizabeth R. Hirsh Fleisher (August 28, 1892 – June 8, 1975) was the first woman architect to pass exams to become a registered architect in Philadelphia, Pennsylvania, and the fourth woman to do so in the state.

Early years 
Elizabeth R. Hirsh Fleisher was born in Philadelphia on August 28, 1892 to Harry B. Hirsh, founder of Belmont Iron Works, and Minnie Rosenberg Hirsh. In 1910, she graduated from Philadelphia High School for Girls and in 1914, she received her Bachelor of Arts from Wellesley College. During her time at college, she studied abroad at the University of Berlin between 1912 and 1913. In 1917, she served as the president of the Philadelphia Wellesley Club. In 1929, she obtained her Master of Architecture  from the Cambridge School of Architecture and Landscape Architecture. Again, she studied abroad during her time at graduate school at the University of Oxford in 1928.

Career

She partnered with Gabriel Roth in 1941 to establish Roth & Fleisher, and they worked together until she retired in 1958. They built factories, theaters, apartment buildings and automobile showrooms. She is known for designing the Parkway House in Philadelphia.

Parkway House
Fleisher was the design architect for the Parkway House. Located at 22nd Street and Pennsylvania Avenue, Parkway house was one of the first postwar luxury apartment buildings in Philadelphia.

The 14-story brick clad concrete and steel building contains elements of both the Art Deco and International styles.

Personal life
Elizabeth was married to landscape architect Horace Fleisher.

She is buried in Mount Sinai Cemetery, Philadelphia.

References 

1892 births
1975 deaths
20th-century American architects
American women architects
Wellesley College alumni
Architects from Philadelphia
20th-century American women